Tuloy Pa Rin Ang Awit is the sixth studio album by Filipino singer and actress Jolina Magdangal released by GMA Records in February 2006. A Special Edition was released on July of the same year to include a special bonus VCD which contains the music videos of "Makulay Na Buhay", "Let Me Be The One", and performance video and music video of the first single "Maybe It's You".

Track listing

Personnel
Adapted from the Tuloy Pa Rin Ang Awit liner notes.

 Buddy Medina – executive producer
 Kedy Sanchez – supervising producer
 Rene Salta – in-charge of marketing
 Dominic Benedicto – recording engineer, asiatec pink noise recording studios
 Nikki Cunanan – recording engineer, asiatec pink noise recording studios
 Jonathan Ong – recording engineer, sonic state audio
 Arnold Jallores – recording engineer, mixsonic recording studios
 Eric Apuyan – recording engineer, amerasian studios
 Oyet San Diego – recording engineer, gma network center post prod facilities
 Jolina Magdangal – album concept
 Joseph De Vera – cover design & final artwork
 Jason Tablante – photography
 Jeffrey Rogador – stylist
 Boying Eustaquio – wardrobe
 Jonathan Velasco – make-up

See also
GMA Records
GMA Network

References

2006 albums
Jolina Magdangal albums
GMA Music albums